Bela varovtsiana is an extinct species of sea snail, a marine gastropod mollusk in the family Mangeliidae.

Description

Distribution
Fossils of this species have been found in Miocene strata in Ukraine; age range: 13.65 to 11.608 Ma

References

External links

varovtsiana